Behind Enemy Lines is a 2001 American war film directed by John Moore in his directorial debut, and starring Owen Wilson and Gene Hackman. The film tells the story of Lieutenant Chris Burnett, an American naval flight officer who is shot down over Bosnia and uncovers genocide during the Bosnian War. Meanwhile, his commanding officer is struggling to gain approval to launch a combat search and rescue mission to save Burnett. The plot is loosely based on the 1995 Mrkonjić Grad incident that occurred during the war.

Released on November 30, 2001, Behind Enemy Lines received generally negative reviews from critics. However, it was a considerable box office success, taking in nearly $92 million worldwide against a $40 million budget. The film started a franchise of direct-to-video spiritual successors: Behind Enemy Lines II: Axis of Evil, Behind Enemy Lines: Colombia, and SEAL Team 8: Behind Enemy Lines, with the third film being co-produced by WWE Studios.

Plot
During the Bosnian War, United States Navy flight officer Lieutenant Chris Burnett and pilot Lieutenant Jeremy Stackhouse are stationed on the aircraft carrier  in the Adriatic Sea. Burnett is preparing to leave the Navy, and clashes with his commanding officer, Admiral Leslie Reigart. On Christmas, Reigart assigns Burnett and Stackhouse to fly an aerial reconnaissance mission, which goes smoothly until they spot unusual activity in the demilitarized zone. Burnett persuades Stackhouse to fly their F/A-18F Super Hornet off-course for a closer look, unaware that they are photographing Serb Volunteer Guard soldiers burying massacred Bosniak civilians in mass graves. The local Bosnian Serb paramilitary commander, General Miroslav Lokar, is conducting a secret genocidal campaign against the Bosniak population, and orders the jet be shot down.

Attempting to outmaneuver Lokar's surface-to-air missiles, Burnett and Stackhouse's jet is hit, forcing them to eject. Lokar and his men find the injured Stackhouse, who is executed by Sasha Ivanic, one of Lokar's right-hand men. Watching nearby, Burnett flees into the wilderness, and Lokar orders his deputy, Colonel Bazda, and Sasha to hunt him down. Burnett radios for help and receives an extraction point from Reigart, who is forced to stand down after Admiral Piquet, the commander of NATO naval forces in the region, warns him that rescuing Burnett in the demilitarized zone risks derailing the peace process. Burnett reaches the extraction point only to be informed that he must continue to another location, miles outside the demilitarized zone, in order to be rescued.

Spotting Bazda's patrol, Burnett falls into a mass grave, and hides under a corpse until the Serbs move on. To ensure Burnett's rescue, Reigart leaks news of the downed jet to Sky News, angering Piquet. Lokar realizes that the American jet's hard drive with the incriminating photographs may still be in the wreckage. Heading to the new extraction point, Burnett escapes Serb soldiers through a minefield. Pursued by Sasha, he encounters Bosniak guerrillas who offer him a ride to the town of Hač, which turns out to be a war zone. After the battle, Serb troops believe they have found Burnett's body, but Sasha realizes Burnett switched uniforms with a dead Serb guerrilla and escaped. The Serbs present the corpse wearing Burnett's uniform to the media, convincing NATO forces that Burnett has been killed, and the mission to rescue him is aborted just as he reaches the extraction point.

Realizing why the Serbs shot him down, Burnett remembers a statue of an angel near where his ejection seat landed, and returns to find it. He reactivates the seat's rescue beacon, notifying his carrier group that he is still alive, but also alerting the Serbs to his location. Knowing he risks being relieved of command, Reigart prepares a Marine Force Recon task force to rescue Burnett, in defiance of Piquet's orders. On the way to kill Burnett and recover his body, Bazda steps on a landmine; Sasha abandons him to his fate, and the explosion alerts Burnett that someone is approaching. Sasha finds the ejection seat, but is ambushed by Burnett, who, despite taking a shot in the arm, fatally stabs him with the spike of a railroad flare. Lokar arrives with armored vehicles and infantry, but is held off by Reigart's task force. Retrieving the hard drive, Burnett is successfully rescued, much to the dismay of Lokar as his crime is now being exposed.

The photographs of the mass grave lead to Lokar's arrest and conviction for war crimes including genocide. Reigart's actions result in him being relieved of command and retiring from service, and Burnett continues his career in the Navy.

Cast
 Owen Wilson as Navy Pilot Lieutenant Chris "Longhorn" Burnett
 Gene Hackman as Rear Admiral Leslie McMahon Reigart
 Gabriel Macht as Navy Pilot Lieutenant Jeremy "Smoke" Stackhouse
 Charles Malik Whitfield as Marine Captain Glen Rodway
 David Keith as Master Chief Tom O'Malley
 Olek Krupa as Serb General Miroslav Lokar
 Joaquim de Almeida as Admiral Juan Miguel Piquet
 Vladimir Mashkov as Serb Sniper Sasha Ivanic
 Marko Igonda as Serb Colonel Viktor Bazda
 Eyal Podell as Petty Officer Kennedy
 Laurence Mason as Captain Glen Brandon
 Leon Russom as Ed Burnett
 Geoff Pierson as Admiral Donnelly
 Vladimir Oktasec as Serb President Petrovic
 Salaetin Bilal as Muslim Guerilla Leader Ejup
 Kamil Kollárik as Muslim Guerilla Babić
 Aernout van Lynden as himself

Production 
The film was shot at the Koliba Studios in Bratislava, Slovakia and on location in the Slovakian village of Háj (in the village of Háj there is also a prop of an angel from the film).

The  was the aircraft carrier featured in the film. Exterior naval footage was filmed on board the carrier. The release date was originally January 18, 2002, but this was moved to November 30, 2001.

Historical inspiration

The film bears some resemblance to the experiences of former U.S. Air Force Captain Scott O'Grady, who was shot down over Bosnia on June 2, 1995. He survived for six days before being rescued by U.S. Marines. O'Grady, who later became a children's author and motivational speaker, filed suit against both the producers of Behind Enemy Lines as well as Behind Enemy Lines: The Scott O’Grady Story, a 1998 documentary that Discovery Channel aired on his experience, for defamation of character, accusing the film's producers of invasion of privacy through the misappropriation of his name, likeness and identity, false representation and false advertising, and contending that those involved in both works produced them without his permission, and that the commercial value of his name was damaged by them. O'Grady's complaint indicated that among other things, he was troubled by the disobedience and profanity exhibited by the feature film's main character. O'Grady also accused Fox of using the documentary to promote the feature film and making a film about his ordeal without his permission. The film's characters and events differ from O'Grady's experience; he never entered populated areas, nor did he interact with civilians, and did not engage in direct combat with enemy soldiers. Also, O'Grady never flew an F/A-18F, but rather an F-16 Fighting Falcon. The case was settled out of court.

Reception

Box office
The film made $18.7 million in its opening week in the U.S., landing at the #2 spot and was held off the top spot by Harry Potter and the Sorcerer's Stone. Behind Enemy Lines eventually grossed $92 million worldwide, of which $59 million was from North America. The budget was estimated to be $40 million.

Critical response
Behind Enemy Lines received generally negative reviews from critics. Review aggregator website Rotten Tomatoes gives the film a score of 37% based on reviews from 130 critics, with a weighted average of 4.8/10 and the site's consensus stating "The plot for Behind Enemy Lines is more jingoistic than credible, and the overload of flashy visual tricks makes the action sequences resemble a video game." Metacritic has assigned the film an average score of 49 out of 100 based on 29 reviews from mainstream critics, indicating "mixed or average reviews". Audiences surveyed by CinemaScore gave the film a grade "B+" on scale of A to F.

Roger Ebert gave the film 1½ stars out of four, likening it to a comedy: "Its hero is so reckless and its villains so incompetent that it's a showdown between a man begging to be shot, and an enemy that can't hit the side of a Bosnian barn."

Sequels
Behind Enemy Lines was followed by three direct-to-video Spiritual successors. Behind Enemy Lines II: Axis of Evil was released in 2006, Behind Enemy Lines: Colombia was released in 2009 (this film was co-produced by WWE Studios) and SEAL Team 8: Behind Enemy Lines was released in 2014.

2017 television pilot
The Fox network ordered a pilot episode of a series loosely based on the film in February 2017 for consideration as part of the network's 2017–18 television season. It was ultimately canceled.

References

External links

 
 
 
 
 
 

Behind Enemy Lines (film series)
2001 films
2000s action war films
2000s war drama films
20th Century Fox films
American action war films
American action drama films
American aviation films
Bosnian War films
Davis Entertainment films
Films scored by Don Davis (composer)
Films about shot-down aviators
Films directed by John Moore
Films produced by John Davis
Films set in 1995
Films shot in Slovakia
Films with screenplays by Zak Penn
Films about the United States Marine Corps
Films about the United States Navy
Yugoslav Wars in fiction
American war drama films
2001 directorial debut films
2000s action drama films
Films with screenplays by Jim Thomas (screenwriter)
Films with screenplays by John Thomas (screenwriter)
Films set on aircraft carriers
2000s American films